Tyyne Järvi (4 February 1891 – 4 April 1929) was a Finnish swimmer. She competed in the women's 100 metre freestyle event at the 1912 Summer Olympics. She was the first woman to represent Finland at the Olympics.

References

External links
 

1891 births
1929 deaths
Sportspeople from Vaasa
People from Vaasa Province (Grand Duchy of Finland)
Finnish female freestyle swimmers
Olympic swimmers of Finland
Swimmers at the 1912 Summer Olympics